Gary Isaac (born 15 February 1966 in Dufftown, Scotland) is a Scottish former Scotland A international rugby union player for Glasgow Warriors at the Loosehead Prop position. His rugby career spanned the amateur and professional era. He is President of Gala.

Rugby career
He began playing for amateur club Moray Rugby Club.

He played for amateur club Gala and Kilmarnock Falcons.

He also represented the amateur provincial district side South.

Isaac has a Scotland A Cap, but he is one of around 30 players who could be retrospectively also awarded a full senior cap if the SRU decides that Scotland duty on international tour should be worthy enough. Scotland's non cap international games include: Argentina (3), Canada, Fiji (2), Japan (4), Portugal, Spain (4), Tonga (2), USA, Western Samoa, Zimbabwe (5).

He was included in the professional provincial Glasgow side of 1997-98 season. He played in two pre-season friendlies: the first against London Scottish on 10 August 1997; and the second against Sale Sharks on 16 August 1997.

Isaac was a Director of Rugby at Gala. He then held the position of Vice President, before becoming President of the club.

References

External links
ESPN Profile

1966 births
Living people
Scottish rugby union players
Gala RFC players
Glasgow Warriors players
Kilmarnock RFC players
South of Scotland District (rugby union) players
Rugby union players from Moray
Scotland 'A' international rugby union players
Rugby union props